Lady Lucy Somerset, Baroness Latimer (c. 1524 – 23 February 1583) was an English noblewoman and the daughter of Henry Somerset, 2nd Earl of Worcester and his second wife, Elizabeth Browne. Lucy served as a Maid of Honour to Queen consort Catherine Howard. Lady Lucy married in 1545, John Neville, 4th Baron Latimer, the stepson of King Henry's sixth consort Catherine Parr to whom Lucy served in the capacity of Lady-in-waiting.

Family
Lucy Somerset was born about 1524 to Henry Somerset, 2nd Earl of Worcester, and his second wife, Elizabeth Browne, the daughter of Sir Anthony Browne, Governor of Queenborough and Lieutenant of Calais and his second wife, Lucy Neville, daughter of John Neville, 1st Marquess of Montagu. Through Lucy's aunt's marriage to Sir Charles Brandon, later Duke of Suffolk, she was a first cousin of Lady Anne Brandon, and her younger sister, Lady Mary Brandon.

At the royal court
Lucy was sent to the court of Henry VIII where she served his fifth consort, Queen Catherine Howard as a Maid of Honour. In 1542, when the Queen was awaiting execution for High Treason after having been found guilty of adultery, Lucy was mentioned in a letter by Imperial Ambassador Eustace Chapuys to his master Charles V, Holy Roman Emperor as having been one of the three ladies in whom the King was showing a marked interest and was considering for his sixth wife.

However, in 1543, the King chose for his sixth consort, the Dowager Lady Latimer, Catherine Parr. After her marriage in 1545, Lucy was invited to become lady-in-waiting to Queen Catherine as the new Lady Latimer. Lucy became part of the close knit circle around the queen.

Marriage and issue
In 1545, she married Queen Catherine Parr's stepson, John Neville, 4th Baron Latimer (c. 1520 – 22 April 1577), making her the new Baroness Latimer.
Together they had four daughters who became co-heiresses to John and the barony of Latimer:

 Catherine Neville (1546 – 28 October 1596), married Henry Percy, 8th Earl of Northumberland, by whom she had issue.
 Dorothy Neville (1547 – 23 March 1609), married Thomas Cecil, 1st Earl of Exeter, by whom she had issue.
 Lucy Neville (died April 1608), married Sir William Cornwallis of Brome Hall, by whom she had issue.
 Elizabeth Neville (c. 1550 – 1630), married firstly Sir John Danvers of Dauntsey, by whom she had issue, she married secondly Sir Edmund Carey.

All of their daughter's first marriages above produced children.

Lord Latimer died without sons in 1577; his four daughters became his joint heiresses. The barony became abeyant until 1913, when its abeyance was terminated in favour of Latimer's distant descendant Francis Money-Coutts, 5th Baron Latymer.

Death
Lucy died on 23 February 1583 and was buried in Hackney as she had requested in her will which was dated 16 November 1582.

Ancestry

Footnotes

References
 

1524 births
1583 deaths
British maids of honour
Daughters of British earls
English ladies-in-waiting
16th-century English women
Household of Catherine Parr
Household of Catherine Howard
English baronesses
Wives of knights